The 368th Training Squadron is a United States Air Force ground training unit, located at Fort Leonard Wood, Missouri. The squadron reports to the 782d Training Group, part of the 82d Training Wing, at Sheppard Air Force Base, Texas and conducts training for airmen in civil engineering, (including Engineering Assistant, Pavement and Equipment, and Emergency Management) as well as in Logistics Readiness in Ground Transportation.

The squadron was first activated in 1942 as the 368th Bombardment Squadron.  After training in the United States, it became one of the first units to deploy to the European Theater of Operations to participate in the strategic bombing campaign against Germany. earning two Distinguished Unit Citations.  After V-E Day, the squadron remained in Europe and participated in the photographic mapping of Europe and Africa until it was inactivated in 1946.

The squadron was reactivated in 1947 and served as a medium bomber unit with Strategic Air Command (SAC) until inactivating in 1963, as SAC drew down its medium bomber force.

History

World War II

The squadron was established as a Boeing B-17 Flying Fortress heavy bomber unit in early 1942. Trained under Second Air Force before deploying to England in September 1942, it became one of the first heavy bomber squadrons of the VIII Bomber Command 1st Bombardment Division. It was a highly decorated squadron during the air offensive over Nazi Germany and occupied Europe, engaging in strategic bombardment operations until the end of the war in Europe, in April 1945.  After the war, the squadron assisted in demobilizing personnel using B-17s as transports along Air Transport Command routes from Western Europe, Italy and the United Kingdom to Gibraltar, and north and west Africa.

The 368th was reassigned to United States Air Forces in Europe occupation forces in late 1945, engaging in photographic mapping and strategic reconnaissance operations over Western occupation zones of Germany as well as the Soviet zone. Moved to Istres-Le Tubé Air Base, France, it absorbed parts of demobilized squadrons and then returned to Germany as part of the American occupation forces. It was demobilized in Germany at the end of 1946.

Strategic Air Command
Reactivated as a Strategic Air Command (SAC) Boeing B-29 Superfortress squadron at MacDill AFB, Florida in 1948, the squadron began upgrading to the new Boeing B-50 Superfortress, an advanced version of the B-29, in 1950. The B-50 gave the unit the capability to carry heavy loads of conventional weapons faster and farther; it was also designed for atomic bomb missions if necessary.

The squadron began receiving the first production models of the new Boeing B-47 Stratojet jet bomber in 1951 and despite initial difficulties, the Stratojet became the mainstay of the medium-bombing strength of SAC all throughout the 1950s. It began sending its B-47s to Aerospace Maintenance and Regeneration Center at Davis-Monthan Air Force Base in 1963 when the aircraft was deemed no longer capable of penetrating Soviet airspace. The 368th was not operational from 3 January through 1 April 1963.

Training unit
The Air Force had begun training certain civil engineering skills at Fort Leonard Wood, Missouri in the 1970s.  After 1992, additional Air Force training in emergency management and ground transportation was moved to Fort Leonard Wood as well, with Detachment 1, 364th Training Squadron acting as the manager for this training.  Eventually, the detachment became the largest in the Air Force, and in early 2018 Air Education and Training Command decided to expand the detachment and replace it with a full squadron.  The squadron was redesignated the 368th Training Squadron and absorbed the personnel and equipment of the detachment in a ceremony on 17 October 2018.

Lineage
 Constituted as the 368th Bombardment Squadron (Heavy) on 28 January 1942
 Activated on 1 March 1942
 Redesignated 368th Bombardment Squadron, Heavy on 20 August 1943
 Inactivated on 25 December 1946
 Redesignated 368th Bombardment Squadron, Very Heavy on 11 June 1947
 Activated on 1 July 1947
 Redesignated 368th Bombardment Squadron, Medium on 11 August 1948
 Inactivated on 1 April 1963
 Redesignated 368th Training Squadron 
 Activated c. 17 October 2018

Assignments
 306th Bombardment Group, 1 March 1942 – 25 December 1946
 306th Bombardment Group, 1 July 1947 (attached to 306th Bombardment Wing after 10 February 1951)
 306th Bombardment Wing, 16 June 1952 – 1 April 1963
 782d Training Group, c. 17 October 2018

Stations

 Gowen Field, Idaho, 1 March 1942
 Wendover Field, Utah, c. 6 April-1 August 1942
 RAF Thurleigh (Sta 111), England, c. 6 September 1942
 Detachment operated from: Gibraltar, 18 August 1945 – January 1946; Port Lyautey Airfield, French Morocco, February – 15 July 1946
 AAF Station Giebelstadt (Y-90), Germany, 25 December 1945

 Istres-Le Tubé Air Base (Y-17), France, 24 February 1946
 Detachment operated from: Dakar Airport, French West Africa, January–March 1946
 AAF Station Fürstenfeldbruck (R-72), Germany, 16 August 1946
 AAF Station Lechfeld, Germany (R-71), 13 September-25 December 1946
 Andrews Field, Maryland, 1 July 1947
 MacDill Air Force Base, Florida, 1 August 1948 – 1 April 1963
 Fort Leonard Wood, Missouri, c. 17 October 2018

Aircraft
 Boeing B-17 Flying Fortress, 1942–1946
 Boeing B-29 Superfortress, 1948–1951
 Boeing B-50 Superfortress, 1950–1951
 Boeing B-47 Stratojet, 1951–1963

References

Notes
 Explanatory notes

 Citations

Bibliography

 
 
 
 
 
 

Training squadrons of the United States Air Force
Military units and formations in Missouri